Concord Academy (also known as CA), established in 1922, is a coeducational, independent college preparatory school for boarding and day students in grades 9-12. The school is situated in Concord, Massachusetts. The school enrolled 395 boarding and day students as of 2022.

For 2023, Concord Academy ranked as the 12th best boarding high school in America and 40th best private high school in America, according to Niche, a website that provides information on K-12 schools and colleges.  It also ranked the 5th best boarding high school in Massachusetts. Concord Academy ranks in the top fifteen U.S. boarding schools for student SAT scores and SSAT scores. For the 2021-2022 admissions cycle, Concord Academy had an acceptance rate of 16%, with over a thousand applicants.

Academics
Concord Academy follows a semester program, where most courses are term-based or year-long. The school's curriculum comprises more than 230 courses in eight academic disciplines, and a co-curricular athletics program.

To foster a noncompetitive environment, the school does not compute class rank and awards no academic, arts, athletic, or community awards during the school year or at graduation. The school eliminated all AP courses in the early 2000s due to the purported lack of depth in their curricula. They were replaced by advanced courses designed by teachers, though the school still offers AP exams. Eighty percent of the students taking an AP exam score a 4 or 5.

Demographics
The demographic breakdown of the 395 students registered for the 2013–14 school year was:
Asian – 23.3%
Black – 2.6%
Hispanic – 5.0%
White – 61.7%
Multiracial – 7.4%

Athletics
Concord Academy students play on 28 teams in 23 sports; about 75 percent of students play on at least one team each year. Teams compete in the Eastern Independent League (EIL).

Student life

The dress code at Concord Academy is casual. Boarding students live in three girls' houses and three boys' houses, each holding an average of 25 students. A little more than a third of the day students commute to school on the MBTA Commuter Rail. Day (commuting) students comprise 60% of student population and boarding students 40%.

Students participate in a variety of clubs, performing arts groups, and other activities. The campus is a short walk from restaurants and shops in Concord and students have easy access to Cambridge and Boston via the MBTA Commuter Rail.

Campus
The campus includes eleven historic houses on Main Street, all built as family homes between 1780 and 1830. It is a three-minute walk from the center of Concord and a five-minute walk from the MBTA Commuter Rail stop in Concord.

Among the campus buildings are the PAC (Performing Arts Center), the SHAC (Student Health and Athletic Center), the main school, the newly built CA Labs, and the MAC (Math and Arts Center). The Elizabeth B. Hall Chapel is a 19th-century meetinghouse that was transported to Concord from Barnstead, New Hampshire in 1956. It serves as a meeting place three times per week for the entire Concord Academy community.

Th 13-acre Moriarty Athletic campus, completed in 2012, is a mile from the main campus. It includes six tennis courts, a baseball field, a field hockey field, and two soccer/lacrosse fields. A field house contains changing rooms, a training room, and a common room with fireplace. These new facilities freed up space on the main campus for expansion of academic and arts facilities.

History
Concord Academy was established in September 1922. Enrollment grew gradually from three in 1924 to 20 in 1948. The school's headmistress for the first 15 years was Elsie Garland Hobson, followed by Valerie Knapp (1937–40) and Josephine Tucker (1940–49). Tucker imposed the advisor system and ended the giving of prizes at commencement. Under Elizabeth Hall (1949–63), student population increased. In 1971, Concord Academy became the first all-girls' boarding school in New England to shift to a coeducational model.

Concord Academy has had eleven heads of school since its founding.  Notable heads of school include David Aloian, named headmaster in 1963, Russell Mead, 1971-1976; Thomas Wilcox, 1981-2000; Jacob A. Dresden, 2000-2008; and Richard Hardy, 2009-2020. In 2018, following media reports of inappropriate conduct between a former headmaster and student, Concord Academy banned former headmaster Mead from the campus. The current head of school is Henry Fairfax, who began leading Concord Academy in July 2022.

Other notable dates in the school's history include the dedication of the Elizabeth B. Hall Chapel in 1984, the dedication of the J. Josephine Tucker Library in 1987, and the 2004-05 expansion of the Elizabeth B. Hall Chapel in 2007.

In 2007, Concord Academy purchased a 13.6 acre property a mile from the main campus for $3.7 million to expand its athletic field space. Later named the Moriarty Athletic Campus, the field space was completed in 2012. In 2017, the school completed a renovation of the campus science center, now known as CA Labs.

Notable alumni

Alexandra Berzon – Pulitzer Prize winning journalist.
John K. Byrne – Founder of news website Raw Story.
Sam Davol – Founding member and cellist for the band Magnetic Fields
Ed Droste – Founding member of the band Grizzly Bear
Drew Gilpin Faust – 28th president of Harvard University
Peter R. Fisher – U.S. Under Secretary of the Treasury for Domestic Finance, 2001–2004
Caitlin FitzGerald – American actress and filmmaker
Huntley Fitzpatrick – Author of My Life Next Door, What I Thought Was True, and The Boy Most Likely To.
Julia Glass – 2002 National Book Award-winning author of Three Junes and The Whole World Over.
Charlie Grandy – Television writer, producer, winner of two Emmy Awards and two Writers' Guild Awards for Saturday Night Live; nominated for his work on The Daily Show with Jon Stewart and The Office.
Larry Goldings – Jazz pianist, organist, composer, and Grammy nominee
Claudia Gonson – Founding member of the band Magnetic Fields
Stephen Heymann – Former assistant U.S. attorney for the District of Massachusetts.
Sebastian Junger – Author of The Perfect Storm: A True Story of Men Against the Sea; director of the documentaries Restrepo and Korengal.
Caroline Kennedy – Ambassador to Japan and Australia, author, attorney, daughter of U.S. President John F. Kennedy and Jacqueline Kennedy Onassis
Sarah Koenig – Journalist, radio personality, producer of This American Life and host of the acclaimed podcast Serial
Le1f – Rapper and producer, known for work with Das Racist.
Anita Lo – Award-winning chef.
Susan Minot – Author of Monkeys, Evening, and Folly
Rachel Morrison – cinematographer
Queen Noor of Jordan – Widow of King Hussein of Jordan
Imani Perry – Hughes-Rogers Professor of African American Studies at Princeton University. Winner of 2022 National Book Award, Nonfiction 
Julia Preston – Pulitzer Prize winner
Hilary B. Price – Cartoonist.
Richard Read – Two-time Pulitzer Prize winning journalist, Los Angeles Times national reporter.
Cynthia Schneider – Ambassador to the Netherlands, Distinguished Professor in the Practice of Diplomacy in the School of Foreign Service at Georgetown University
Theo Stockman – Broadway & television actor
Matt Taibbi – Blogger and former columnist for Rolling Stone
Philippe von Borries – co-founder and CEO of Refinery29, president of Lonely Planet

Notable teachers
Kevin Jennings taught at Concord Academy from 1987 to 1995. He was chair of the history department and founded the nation's first Gender-Sexuality Alliance.

References

External links

 Concord Academy's Web site

Private high schools in Massachusetts
Buildings and structures in Concord, Massachusetts
Educational institutions established in 1922
Schools in Middlesex County, Massachusetts
Boarding schools in Massachusetts
1922 establishments in Massachusetts